Events in the year 2012 in Abkhazia.

Incumbents
President: Alexander Ankvab
Vice President: Mikhail Logua
Prime Minister: Leonid Lakerbaia
Speaker of Parliament: Nugzar Ashuba to April 3 Valeri Bganba

Events

February
February 22 – Alexander Ankvab, president of  Abkhazia, survives the sixth assassination attempt as his motorcade is ambushed on the road from Gudauta to Sukhumi.

May
May 24 — In Chuburkhinji a settlement is opened for the families of Russian border guards.
May 28 — Two policemen and one local resident sitting are shot dead in a cafe in Gali.
May 30 — 37 repatriated members of the Abkhaz diaspora and their families receive restored apartments in Machara.

June
June 4 — Valeri Kvarchia defeats Aida Ashuba in the second round of the rerun of the parliamentary election in constituency no. 21.
June 4 — The Psyrtskha power plant in New Athos is reopened after repairs that started in September 2008.
June 9 — Three prisoners escape from Dranda prison — two brothers from Shashikvara, Gali District, convicted for armed robberies and kidnapping, and one man from Grigolishi in Georgia's Zugdidi District convicted for the smuggling of weapons and drugs.
June 11 — Two of the three prisoners who escaped on 9 June are captured in Ganachleba, Gulripshi District.
June 21 — The last of the prisoners who escaped on 9 June is found dead in the Kodori river bed in Adziubzha, Ochamchira District.
June 25 — Former Interior Minister Leonid Dzapshba is indicted for the abuse of funds at his disposal as the head of the Abkhazian Football Federation.

Deaths
May 25 – Timur Logua, Deputy of the People's Assembly (born 1972).

See also
2012 in Georgia

References

 

 
2010s in Abkhazia
Years of the 21st century in Abkhazia
Abkhazia
Abkhazia
Abkhazia